The Minor Basilica of the Black Nazarene, known canonically as the Parish of Saint John the Baptist and also known as Quiapo Church, is a prominent basilica in the district of Quiapo in the city of Manila, Philippines. The basilica is famous home for the Black Nazarene, a dark statue of Jesus Christ said to be miraculous. The basilica is under the jurisdiction of the Archdiocese of Manila and its current rector is Rev. Fr. Rufino C. Sescon, Jr.

History
The earliest church, built by missionaries of the Order of Friars Minor, was made of bamboo for the frame and nipa leaves as thatching. In 1574, Limahong and his soldiers destroyed and burned the church. Formerly a visita (chapel-of-ease) of Santa Ana, the Franciscan friar Antonio de Nombella founded the church in 1588 which was dedicated to Saint John the Baptist, the forerunner of Christ. It burned down in 1603 and the parish was temporarily turned over to the Jesuits until secular clergy objected. Governor-General Santiago de Vera initiated the full construction of the church in 1686. On April 8, 1639, the administration of the church was returned to the seculars who had always taking care of the church's welfare.

During the Seven Years' War, the British attempted to destroy the church in 1762 as they invaded Manila. An earthquake in 1863 destroyed the church and in its place a temporary church was built. Fr. Eusebio de León later reconstructed the ruined church in 1879, completing the structure in 1889 with the assistance of Rev. Manuel Roxas. Roxas had raised the unprecedented amount of ₱40,000.00 from donations and lay contributions. On October 30, 1928, the church caught fire again, in which  the church's wooden ceiling and sacristy were destroyed.

In 1933, Fr. Magdaleno Castillo began the reconstruction of the church from the plan prepared by National Artist of the Philippines architect Juan Nakpil – son of composer Julio Nakpil. He added the church's dome and a second belfry to balance out the façade. The reconstructed church, made of reinforced concrete, was completed in 1935. During World War II, parts of Quiapo were destroyed except for Quiapo Church.

Expansion and contemporary history 

Msgr. José Abriol appointed architect José María Zaragoza and engineer Eduardo Santiago to expand the church in order to accommodate more devotees. The church was expanded from 1984 to 1986. Changes to the building were made, such as the removal of the ornate exposed trusses, the removal of the interior columns to create an expansive columnless structure, and the realignment of the perimeter walls. Even though Zaragoza did not tamper the facade and altar area, his renovation project received criticisms like comparing the new interior with a basketball court. The criticisms did not affect the popularity of the church.

Jaime Cardinal Sin, then-Archbishop of Manila, reconsecrated the church on September 28, 1987. The church was then conferred the title Basilica Minor of the Nuestro Padre Jesús Nazareno on February 1, 1988. Papal Nuncio to the Philippines, Archbishop Bruno Torpigliani, blessed the altar of Saint Lorenzo Ruíz on that day.

In 2006, the church celebrated the quadricentennial anniversary of the arrival of the image of the Black Nazarene in the Philippines. As part of the celebrations, a jubilee wall was set up at the entrance gate where devotees would post and write their personal testimonials on their faith and devotion to the Black Nazarene.

Architecture 

Built in the Baroque style, Quiapo Church's façade is distinctive with twisted columns on both levels. The Corinthian columns of the second level has a third of its shaft twisted near the base, while the upper portion has a smooth surface. The topmost portion of the four-storey belfries are rimmed with balustrades and decorated with huge scrolls. The tympanum of the pediment has a pair of chalice-shaped finials, and towards the end of the raking cornice, urn-like vases mark the end of the pediment. A quatrefoil window in the center of the pediment was sealed up in the late 1980s and replaced with a relief of the crossed keys and tiara of the pope – a symbol of its status as a minor basilica.

With its recent renovation, only the façade, the dome, the transept, and the apse retained the classic design.

Devotion to the Black Nazarene

The masses go to Quiapo Church in downtown Plaza Miranda and drop a visit to the Nuestro Señor Jesús Nazareno (a dark figure of Christ carved by a Mexican artist from black wood) whose image, reputedly miraculous, was brought to the country in a Spanish galleon in the 17th century.

Quiapo Church holds a novena every Friday, Quiapo Day, in honour of the Black Nazarene, and is attended by thousands of devotees. A note is sounded before the novena begins as the devotees to the Black Nazarene troop in and emit their strings of petitions. One can encounter the traditional folk Catholicism of Filipinos when they all climb the narrow flight of stairs to kiss the Señor's foot or wipe it with their handkerchiefs they use every time they visit. 

The Feast of the Black Nazarene on January 9 celebrates the traslación (solemn translation) of the statue to the church from the Church of Saint Nicholas Tolentino. Traffic is re-routed round the devotees who participate in this district's fiesta. There are men who are devoted to carry the Black Nazarene statue around a specific route. They have a panata, a vow to serve the Lord in this sacrifice. These people believed that an afternoon's participation in the procession can repent their sins and shady deals in a year.

Daily hourly Masses (all of which are celebrated in the Tagalog language) are celebrated and devotees come from all walks of life, the noon services are today also broadcast on TV Maria, YouTube and through the church's Official Facebook page via Facebook Live, which by 2017 has also expanded to include all the weekend and holiday Masses held.

The Quiapo Parochial School was created in 1951 for the purpose of addressing the scholastic needs of the parish. The school's patron is the Black Nazarene, which is a significant factor to the change of the school name to Nazarene Catholic School.

Abortifacients sold by private vendors
The vicinity of the church is a popular area for peddlers of unsafe abortifacients, local gastric irritants and untested herbal folk (potions) remedies. The merchandise are anonymously sold from stalls surrounding the Basilica and the Plaza Miranda fronting it. Abortion is illegal in the Philippines, and individuals who cannot afford the surgical procedure resort to these vendors.

The media often covers stories of dead foetuses being abandoned outside of the church's Blessed Sacrament chapel, a practise condemned by the Archdiocese of Manila. Cardinal Gaudencio Rosales has issued several canonical excommunications for women who perform intentional abortion in relation to such practices near the shrine, as ruled by the Latae Sententiae punishment by the Roman Catholic Church. The fetuses covered by the Filipino TV media are often left anonymously wrapped in sack-cloth or plain boxes.

Media
The church made an appearance in the 2009–2010 ABS-CBN religious-themed teleseries May Bukas Pa.

Gallery

See also
 Black Nazarene
 Manila Cathedral

References

External links 

 
 Minor Basilica of the Black Nazarene
 History of Quiapo
 Veneration of the Black Nazarene in Quiapo
 manilacathedral.org 
 Quiapo Surviving 400 Years
 opinion.inquirer.net
 Devotion to the Black Nazarene: A Pastoral Understanding by Msgr. Jose Clemente F. Ignacio
 

Roman Catholic churches in Manila
Basilica churches in the Philippines
Buildings and structures in Quiapo, Manila
Cultural Properties of the Philippines in Metro Manila
Baroque church buildings in the Philippines
1588 establishments in the Spanish Empire
Roman Catholic churches completed in 1986
20th-century Roman Catholic church buildings in the Philippines
Churches in the Roman Catholic Archdiocese of Manila